Mel Kendrick (born July 28, 1949), is an American visual artist, known primarily for his sculptural work in wood, bronze, rubber, paper and, most recently, cast concrete. Kendrick's work reflects a deep fascination with process, space, and geometry. The New York Times has written that Kendrick's work "looks offhand, but is in fact complex almost to the point of craziness, Piranesi-style."

Life and work
Born in Boston, Massachusetts, Kendrick attended Phillips Academy, Andover and Trinity College, Connecticut before he moved to New York City in 1971 where he studied at Hunter College under Tony Smith and worked for Dorothea Rockburne. His first solo show at Artists Space was in 1974.

Since then he has shown in at least thirty-six solo shows and numerous group shows. His most recent works have focused on monumental cast concrete forms, such as the "Markers" installation in Madison Square Park and "jacks", a series of massive black and white intersecting cylinders extrapolated from their own bases. Kendrick lives and works in New York.

Kendrick's work can be found in numerous permanent collections, including The Art Institute of Chicago, The Brooklyn Museum, The Dallas Museum of Art, The Metropolitan Museum of Art, MoMA, The National Gallery of Art, The Philadelphia Museum of Art, The Storm King Art Center and the Whitney Museum of American Art.

References

External links
New York Times ART IN REVIEW: Mel Kendrick-Drawings in Wood
Art in America Mel Kendrick at David Nolan Gallery
David Nolan Gallery: Mel Kendrick
PSFK Mel Kendrick's Markers In Madison Square Park
Mel Kendrick: Official Page
The Brooklyn Rail In Conversation: Mel Kendrick with Ben La Rocco

1949 births
Living people
Hunter College alumni
20th-century American sculptors
Minimalist artists
American printmakers
21st-century American sculptors